Stone in the Water is an album by Italian pianist Stefano Bollani recorded in 2008 and released on the ECM label.

Reception
The Allmusic review by Michael G. Nastos awarded the album 3½ stars stating "the music you hear Bollani and his trio creating is pure and serene, far removed from a traditional jazz trio, and approaching new era – not new age – craftsmanship".

Track listing
All compositions by Stefano Bollani except as indicated

 "Dom de Iludir" (Caetano Veloso) – 5:54 
 "Orvieto" (Jesper Bodilsen) – 8:01 
 "Edith" (Bodilsen) – 7:29 
 "Brigas Nunca Mais" (Vinicius De Moraes, Antonio Carlos Jobim) – 6:27 
 "Il Cervello del Pavone" – 7:06 
 "Un Sasso Nello Stagno" – 5:52 
 "Improvisation 13 en la Mineur" (Francis Poulenc) – 6:18 
 "Asuda" – 8:13 
 "Joker in the Village" – 6:24

Personnel
 Stefano Bollani — piano
 Jesper Bodilsen — double bass 
 Morten Lund — drums

References

ECM Records albums
Stefano Bollani albums
2009 albums
Albums produced by Manfred Eicher